The Pando mine is one of the largest gold mines in Bolivia and in the world. The mine is located in the southern  part of Bolivia in Potosí Department. The mine has estimated reserves of 5.3 million oz of gold.

References 

Gold mines in Bolivia
Mines in Potosí Department